The Mumbai Urban Transport Project (MUTP), is a project formulated by the Mumbai Metropolitan Region Development Authority (MMRDA) to bring about improvement in the traffic and transport situation in the Mumbai metropolitan region with the assistance of the World Bank.

Background

The parties involved in the project include:
 Government of Maharashtra
 Mumbai Railway Vikas Corporation (MRVC) 
 Indian Railways (IR)
 Mumbai Metropolitan Region Development Authority (MMRDA)
 Brihanmumbai Municipal Corporation (BMC)
 Brihanmumbai Electric Supply and Transport (BEST)
 World Bank

Phase I
Phase I began in 2002 and was completed in 2011. Most of the money was spent on railway projects, while less than a fourth was spent on road projects.

The following projects were proposed to be implemented under MUTP:

Road transport
Widening and improvement of the Jogeshwari - Vikhroli Link Road
Santa Cruz – Chembur Link Road (including an ROB at Kurla)
ROB at Jogeshwari (South)
ROB at Jogeshwari (North)
ROB at Vikhroli
Purchase of 644 eco friendly buses
Pedestrian Grade Separation Schemes
Area Traffic Control System in the Island City
Station Area Traffic Improvement Schemes (SATIS) at 6 stations
Other traffic management and safety schemes including footpaths
Environment - Air quality monitoring
Different studies and technical assistance

Rail transport
5th line on Western Railway between Mahim and Borivali
5th and 6th lines between Kurla and Thane
Borivli-Bhayandar additional pair of lines (including Virar car shed and Virar - Dahanu road track centre work)
Optimisation on Western Railway
Optimisation on Central Railway
Optimisation on Harbour line
DC/AC conversion
Procurement of new EMUs (trains)
EMU maintenance facilities
Stabling lines
Track machines
Technical assistance and studies - setting up of MRVC
PPF reimbursement

The road projects included in MUTP were the Santa Cruz – Chembur Link Road (SCLR) and the Jogeshwari - Vikhroli Link Road (JVLR).

Railway Minister Dinesh Trivedi announced in 2012 that Phase I was completed.

Phase II

The projects proposed under MUTP–II were:

Phase III
Phase III of the Mumbai Urban Transport Project was approved on 8 December 2011. It will cost . The feasibility study for the project cost . The project includes a fast corridor from Chhatrapati Shivaji Terminus to Panvel with a connection to the proposed new Navi Mumbai International Airport, extending the Harbour Line to Borivali, and multiple additional tracks being laid on existing routes. The project is scheduled for completion in 2031.

Phase 3A
The Union Cabinet approved Phase 3A of the MUTP on 7 March 2019. It will cost  shared equally by the Union and State Governments, and is scheduled to be completed within 5 years. Projects approved under Phase 3A include:

Procurement of 191 air-conditioned rakes
Extension of the Harbour Line from Goregaon up to Borivali
Segregation of suburban and long-distance traffic at Kalyan Yard 
Implementing a Communications Based Train Control System
Revamping 19 railway stations
Additional capacity of existing lines
5th and 6th lines between Borivali and Virar
4th line between Kalyan and Asangaon
3rd and 4th lines between Kalyan and Badlapur

References

External links
 Mumbai Urban Transport Project Official website

Transport in Mumbai
2002 establishments in Maharashtra